Vidor Borsig (born 11 February 1963) is a Slovak water polo player. He competed in the men's tournament at the 1992 Summer Olympics.

References

1963 births
Living people
Slovak male water polo players
Olympic water polo players of Czechoslovakia
Water polo players at the 1992 Summer Olympics
Sportspeople from Bratislava